The Bigelow Theatre (also known as Bigelow-Sanford Theater and as Hollywood Half Hour and Marquee Theater in syndication) is an American anthology series originally broadcast on CBS Television and on the DuMont Television Network.

This series is not to be confused with the similarly named The Bigelow Show, a musical variety program which aired on NBC and CBS in the late 1940s.

Broadcast history
The series aired on CBS on Sunday nights at 6pm EST from December 10, 1950, to June 3, 1951. There were no regularly featured actors on The Bigelow Theatre, but guest stars included James Dean, George C. Scott, Raymond Burr, Cesar Romero, Lloyd Bridges, Martin Milner, Gig Young, Ann Dvorak, Ruth Warrick, Gale Storm, and Chico Marx.

Production of episodes used multiple cameras that were "directed and monitored by a control room staff" as was done with live TV, but the cameras' output was recorded on film. 

After the series ended on CBS, the show was retitled The Bigelow-Sanford Theatre and aired on DuMont on Thursdays at 10pm EST from September 6 through December 27, 1951. There were 27 episodes on CBS, and 15 on DuMont, however, some of the DuMont episodes were reruns of the CBS series.

Seventeen filmed episodes of the program were leased and run after having been shown originally on The Silver Theatre.

Episode status
Nine episodes are held by the UCLA Film and Television Archive, at least two of which (October 4 and the December 27 finale) aired on DuMont.

One CBS episode from February 11, 1951, "Agent From Scotland Yard", is held by the Library of Congress in the J. Fred MacDonald collection.

See also
List of programs broadcast by the DuMont Television Network
List of surviving DuMont Television Network broadcasts
1951-52 United States network television schedule

References

Bibliography
David Weinstein, The Forgotten Network: DuMont and the Birth of American Television (Philadelphia: Temple University Press, 2004) 
Alex McNeil, Total Television, Fourth edition (New York: Penguin Books, 1980) 
Tim Brooks and Earle Marsh, The Complete Directory to Prime Time Network TV Shows, Third edition (New York: Ballantine Books, 1964)

External links

List of episodes at CTVA
DuMont historical website

1950 American television series debuts
1951 American television series endings
1950s American anthology television series
1950s American drama television series
Black-and-white American television shows
CBS original programming
DuMont Television Network original programming
English-language television shows